Timothy Chase "T.C." McCartney (born April 24, 1989) is an American football coach who is the tight ends coach for the Cleveland Browns of the National Football League (NFL). He was previously the quarterbacks coach for the Denver Broncos.

Playing career 
McCartney was expected to take a spot on the roster at Colorado offered by Buffaloes head coach and former assistant of his grandfather, Gary Barnett. However, Barnett was forced to resign in 2005 and the deal fell through when Dan Hawkins was hired. He then walked on to play quarterback at LSU in 2007, playing for Les Miles, another former Colorado assistant under the elder McCartney and the coach who recruited his father. He was redshirted his freshman year in 2007, the year the Tigers won a national championship. Despite this, McCartney still received a championship ring as a member of the team. He was the quarterback for the scout team for three years before turning to coaching in 2011.

Coaching career 
After his graduation from LSU, he spent the 2011 season as a graduate assistant on a LSU squad that won the SEC Championship Game and earned a berth in the BCS national championship game. He joined the coaching staff at Colorado in 2012 as a graduate assistant. He was hired to be an offensive assistant for the Cleveland Browns in 2014, before joining the coaching staff of the San Francisco 49ers as an offensive assistant/quality control coach in 2015. He rejoined his alma mater LSU in 2016 as a graduate assistant.

San Francisco 49ers (second stint) 
McCartney was hired as an offensive assistant & quality control coach for the 49ers in the 2017, reuniting with Kyle Shanahan who he was an offensive assistant under in 2014 when Shanahan was offensive coordinator of the Cleveland Browns.

Denver Broncos 
After then-49ers quarterbacks coach Rich Scangarello was hired as the offensive coordinator for the Denver Broncos in 2019, McCartney followed Scangarello to Denver to be his quarterbacks coach. The only offensive assistant brought over by Scangarello from San Francisco, he was fired after Scangarello was terminated in January 2020.

Cleveland Browns (second stint) 
McCartney joined the Browns coaching staff as an offensive assistant in 2020. In 2022 McCartney was promoted to Tight Ends coach and replaced new Quarterbacks coach Drew Petzing.

Personal life 
McCartney is the son of the late Sal Aunese, a former quarterback for Colorado and Kristy McCartney, the daughter of former Colorado head coach Bill McCartney.

References

External links 
 Cleveland Browns bio
 Colorado Buffaloes bio
 LSU Tigers bio

1984 births
Living people
Sportspeople from Boulder, Colorado
Players of American football from Colorado
American football quarterbacks
LSU Tigers football players
LSU Tigers football coaches
Colorado Buffaloes football coaches
Cleveland Browns coaches
San Francisco 49ers coaches
Denver Broncos coaches